Høje Taastrup station is a railway station in Høje-Taastrup municipality, Denmark, opened on 31 May 1986.

The station is one of the largest in Denmark. It is the terminus of S-train services B and Bx on the Taastrup radial. The station is further served by regional, InterCity and even international trains.

At the south end of the railroad station complex stands "Thor's Tower" (Torstårnet), the tallest sculpture in the Nordic countries. The railway station itself has three distinctive arches, which have become a symbol of the municipality, and have given rise to the moniker "The City of Arches" (Danish: Buernes By, which in a play on words sounds remarkably similar to the phrase Byernes By or "The City of Cities").

See also
 List of railway stations in Denmark

References

External links

S-train (Copenhagen) stations
Railway stations in Copenhagen
Railway stations opened in 1986
Railway stations in Denmark opened in the 20th century